Descriptivism may refer to:
Descriptivist theory of names in philosophy, a view of the nature of meaning and reference generally attributed to Gottlob Frege and Bertrand Russell
Linguistic descriptivism, the practice of objectively analysing and describing how language is spoken